Elvira López Morales (Concepción, Biobío Region, September 13, 1966) is a Chilean film, theater and television actress.

Career 

She made her debut in the successful television series on Canal 13 Fácil de amar playing a small role, then emigrated to TVN in the television series Ámame, which had great success in Chile, where she played the sweet "Carmencita", sister of "J" (Carlos Concha) and friend of "Daniela" (Ángela Contreras). Later, always on the state channel, she played numerous roles in national soap operas, such as Rojo y Miel, Rompecorazón, among others.

Elvira returns in glory and majesty for the successful TV series on Channel 13 Machos, where she played the lost daughter of the "Mercader" family. After her return, she continues to be seen on the screen in unsuccessful teleseries Hippie, the successful Brujas and special appearances in Disparejas, Alguien te mira and Fortunato these last 2 in 2007.

In 2009 she appears in the Channel 13 television series; Cuenta conmigo where she plays Ximena, Anita's best friend, played by Carolina Arregui.

Filmography

Film 
Los agentes de la KGB también se enamoran (1992) Romina
Takilleitor (1997)
Che Kopete, la película - Dolores Dupont (2007)

Telenovelas

TV Series

References

1966 births
Living people
Chilean film actresses
Chilean television actresses
20th-century Chilean actresses
21st-century Chilean actresses
People from Concepción, Chile